Marie Anett (born June 3, 1971 as Marie-Anett Mey) is a French model, entertainer, singer and musician born in Paris, France. She gained popularity and massive success throughout the 1990s as the lead performer of the German Eurodance group Fun Factory.

Life and career

1971–92: Early life
Mey is born on June 3, 1971 as Marie-Anett Mey in Paris, in France. She moved to Hamburg in Germany and met her future fellow Fun Factory band member Toni Cottura there.

1993–94: Joining Fun Factory and Nonstop

Before Fun Factory's third single release Close to you in the late of 1993, Mey replaced lead singer Balca Tözün, who left the band and joined surviving founding members Rodney Hardison from America, Toni Cottura and Stephan Browarczyk from Germany. With the second line-up the band gained massive success, though it has been later revealed, that Tözün kept providing vocals in the background for all their later releases until their disbandment in 1997 with Mey just lip-syncing and performing with the group on stage. Close to you became their first chart success peaking #1 at the Canadian Dance chart. Follow up singles were Take your chance and Pain being chart hits as well, peaking #18 and #24 in the German Single chart respectively. Fun Factory released their debut album Nonstop in 1994. Mey started her side project in 1994 with the band Darkness, a group fronted by her and rapper True, later known as Nana. Their single In my dreams was a hit, whose female vocals were also by Tözün.

1995–97: Fun-Tastic and disbandment
In 1995, the band released their singles I wanna B with U, Celebration and the Manfred Mann cover version retitled and shortened Doh Wah Diddy, all chart hits, peaking #11, #12 and #6 in the German Single chart. In 1995, Fun Factory released their second studio album Fun-Tastic. By this time they began to become more popular throughout Europe and even saw some of their songs to chart in the United States and Canada. The follow up single release was Don't Go Away becoming their yet last moderate chart success. Don't Go Away was also the last single to be promoted by the band as a quartet, when Cottura left the band. As a trio, the group released two more further singles, the ballad I Love You and Oh Yeah Yeah (I Like It). The first mentioned had been dedicated to the leaving member Cottura at the end of the music video, while the latter mentioned single didn't even receive a music video, due to their sudden disbandment in 1997. When Hardison left Fun Factory to join Garcia in 1997, with whom he released three singles, the remaining two members Mey and Browarczyk were joined by the new member Ray Horton and planned to continue with a rebranded band name "Fun Affairs", but had no success with it and Fun Factory split up. In 1997, a first Greatest Hits album has been released to end up the chapter.

1998–2000: Other projects and Solo career
In 2000, Mey briefly launched a musical solo career and released her first and only solo single Be the one. The single also included another song, the B-Side Light in my life. A studio album hasn't been realized.

2001–Present: Music retirement and other ventures
Mey became a make-up artist for the worldwide known make-up company MAC Cosmetics.

Discography

with Fun Factory

Singles
 2000: Be the One

B-Sides
 2000: Light in my Life

Notes

Singers from Paris
French dance musicians
1971 births
Living people